Payday is an animated short film, directed by Friz Freleng and first released in September, 1944. It is part of the Private Snafu series. As in all the Snafu films, the voice of Private Snafu is performed by Mel Blanc.

Plot 

The short opens somewhere in the Middle East. Snafu spends his payday by walking through a local bazaar. Technical Fairy 1st Class operates his own stand, allowing Snafu to invest in his future. He presents a poster with an ideal future for Snafu: a suburban house, a streamlined car, a gorgeous wife, a baby in a stroller, and a doghouse on a well-manicured lawn. Snafu is ready to hand over his money. But a devil appear and lures him into a souvenir shop. As Snafu spends his money, the image on the poster changes. The streamlined car is replaced progressively to a Ford Model T, to a horse and carriage, to a bicycle, and finally into a pair of roller skates.

The setting changes into the Caribbean. Snafu wears a pith helmet and fondles a wad of cash. Its another payday. Technical Fairy appears to him with a bank-book. Within it written: "no dollars, no sense". Snafu is once again led astray, into a local bar. The smoke from the bar turns into a cocktail shaker. The image from the poster changes again.

The setting changes into the Arctic, where Snafu purchases a totem pole from an Eskimo. Technical Fairy operates a "Last Chance" booth. Snafu chooses to enter a Quonset hut and risk his money in a game of craps. As he keeps losing, the image on the poster changes. The suburban house disintegrates into a flophouse, the stork repossesses the baby, and the wife packs a suitcase and leaves. Snafu exits the hut wearing a cardboard box. He has lost his clothes.

He finds a single coin and runs naked to gamble it away. In the remains of Snafu's house, a phone rings. A mouse picks it up and informs the caller that Snafu does not live here anymore.

Analysis 
The scene at the bazaar includes stalls operated by the Sheik and the Son of the Sheik. These are references to the films The Sheik (1921) The Son of the Sheik (1926), both featuring Rudolph Valentino in the eponymous role.

The house that Snafu was supposed to invest was reused in the 1946 cartoon Bacall to Arms, seen in the newsreel segment of the short.

Sources

References 

1944 animated films
1944 films
Short films directed by Friz Freleng
Films set in the Arctic
Films set in the Caribbean
Films set in the Middle East
Private Snafu
Articles containing video clips
Films scored by Carl Stalling
American black-and-white films
1944 comedy films
1940s Warner Bros. animated short films